Jean-Claude Poissant (born 1960) is a Canadian politician who served as the Member of Parliament for the riding of La Prairie in the House of Commons of Canada from 2015 until his defeat in the 2019 election. He is a member of the Liberal Party of Canada. During his tenure, he served as Parliamentary Secretary to the Minister of Agriculture and Agri-Food. Poissant is a fourth-generation dairy and grain farmer and, prior to his election to the House of Commons, served as a municipal councillor.

Electoral record

References

External links
 Official Website

1960 births
Living people
Canadian farmers
Liberal Party of Canada MPs
Members of the House of Commons of Canada from Quebec
Quebec municipal councillors
21st-century Canadian politicians